Nikola Janjić (born 14 July 2002) is a Montenegrin professional footballer who plays as a winger for Osijek.

Club career

NK Osijek
Janjić signed a four-year contract with  Osijek in January 2022. He joins his new team at the end of the 2021–22 Montenegrin First League season, when he played for Sutjeska Nikšić.

International career
Janjić was called in Montenegro U16, Montenegro U17, Montenegro U18, Montenegro U19 and Montenegro U21 national team squads before becoming part of Montenegro national football team, and debuting as a substitution in a friendly win against Greece.

Honours
Sutjeska Nikšić
 Montenegrin First League runner-up: 2019–20, 2020–21

Individual
 The most promising Montenegrin football player from the 2002 generation

References

External links
 
 
 

2002 births
People from Nikšić
Living people
Montenegrin footballers
Montenegro youth international footballers
Montenegro under-21 international footballers
Montenegro international footballers
Croatian Football League players
Association football forwards
FK Sutjeska Nikšić players 
NK Osijek players
Montenegrin First League players